"There Goes" is a song written and recorded by American country music singer Alan Jackson. It was released in July 1997 as the fourth single from his album, Everything I Love. The song reached the top of the Billboard Hot Country Singles & Tracks chart.

Content
The narrator is being seduced by a woman he was trying to play hard to get with but its to no avail when she gets near him and whispers his name.

Chart positions
"There Goes" debuted at number 58 on the U.S. Billboard Hot Country Singles & Tracks for the week of July 12, 1997.

Year-end charts

References

1996 songs
1997 singles
Alan Jackson songs
Songs written by Alan Jackson
Song recordings produced by Keith Stegall
Arista Nashville singles